Ch'alla Phujru (Aymara ch'alla sand, phujru a hole or pit in the earth without water, not very deep, "sand hole", also spelled Challa Phujru) is a  mountain in the Andes of Bolivia east of Poopó Lake. It is located in the Oruro Department, Sebastián Pagador Province, which is identical to the Santiago de Huari Municipality. Ch'alla Phujru lies south-west of the mountain Chullpiri, south of the Anta Qullu valley.

References 

Mountains of Oruro Department